Gokwe South District is one of the eight administrative districts of the Midlands Province of Zimbabwe. The district administrative seat is located in Gokwe Town also known as Gokwe Centre and the District Administrator is the focal person in terms of all district administrative matters. The district is divided into two administrative entities under the Ministry of Local Government, Public Works and National Housing, which are Gokwe South Rural District Council and Gokwe Town Council. The two district administrative entities were legally setup under the Urban Councils Act of 2015 [Chapter 29:15] and Rural District Councils Act [Chapter 29:13] under the constitution of Zimbabwe. The district is further subdivided into  01 senatorial constituency, 05 parliamentary constituencies and 33 council wards. These constituencies and wards are shared between these two administrative entities of Gokwe South District. According to the 2012 ZIMSTAT National Census Statistics the population of the district was at 330 036 people. Gokwe district is in the north-western part of Zimbabwe its average temperature vacillates at 40 degrees Celsius. Gokwe South District shares its boundaries with 06 districts, namely Binga Distirct, Nkayi District, Kwekwe District, Kadoma District, Lupane District and Gokwe North District.

Background
Gokwe South District was created from the division of Gokwe District and had initially been established in 1898. As a result of the introduction of Land Apportionment Act (LAA) of 1930 by the colonial masters, displacement of a number of people from different places to Gokwe began in the 1950s when the Native Land Husbandry Act (NLHA) was put across and marked the implementation of the LAA. As a result of these people migratings to Gokwe, population increased thus leading to the division of Gokwe District to Gokwe North and Gokwe South Districts. The Rural District Councils Act of 1988, which was implemented from July 1993 is the piece of legislation which Gokwe South District came into existence as a result of. This Act is known as the “amalgamation” act, because its main aim was to amalgamate the local authorities responsible for “commercial” and “communal” farming areas within each district. However, it also resulted in some changes to district boundaries and in Gokwe District, where there were no large-scale commercial farms, its main impact was the division of the district into two.

Economic activities

Governance structure 
Gokwe South District has 01 senatorial constituency, 05 parliamentary constituencies, 33 council wards. Constituencies are led by an elected member of parliament and the wards are elected by an elected Councillor.

Senatorial constituency 
Gokwe South District has one senatorial constituency and is led by an elected member of the Senate or Upper House of the Zimbabwe Parliament.

Parliamentary constituencies 
The district has 05 parliamentary constituencies and are led by an elected member of the Lower House or National Assembly Zimbabwe Parliament.

Local council wards 
Local council wards are grouped into either urban wards or rural wards. Urban wards being under Town Councils or cities whereas rural wards being under Rural District Councils.

Traditional leadership 
Gokwe South District like other districts with are classified as being rural is subdivided into different areas of jurisdiction under various chiefs. The chief is the highest ranking traditional leader for those jurisdictions in Gokwe South District and there are 05 chiefs. Each chief has headmen and village heads under their jurisdiction. Chief Jahana and an estimated 8 000 of his people returned to Matabeleland South from Gokwe and were resettled at Gwamanyenga area. The Jahana chieftainship was relocated back to  Fort Rixon, Matabeleland South Province area after they successfully claimed back their ancestral land during Zimbabwe's land reform period. The area was officially which was previously under his jurisdiction reverted to Chief Njelele's jurisdiction and some people may still casually refer to it as Chief Jahana area.

Education

Tertiary institutions

Secondary schools 
Secondary or high schools in Gokwe South District are under the jurisdiction of the Ministry of Primary and Secondary Education.

 BATANAI GOKWE; MUYAMBI VILLAGEW CHIEF MKOKA
 BENGWE; MUTAMBURIGWA VILLAGE CHIEF NEMANGWE
 CHEVECHEVE HIGH; MUCHABAIWA VILLAGE CHIEF NJELELE
 CHEZIYA GOKWE HIGH; KAMBASHA BARRACKS GOKWE TOWN
 CHIDOMA; MAWANA VILLAGE CHIEF NJELELE
 CHISINA (MTANKI); CHADAKUFA VILLAGE CHIEF NJELELE
 CHITOMBO HIGH; MADHUVEKO VILLAGE CHIEF SAI
 CHOTO/TAFARA; CHOTO VILLAGE CHIEF JIRI
 COMMUNITY STUDY CENTRE STAND NUMBER 1495 INDUSTRIAL SITE GOKWE TOWN
 DEFE; DEFE CHIEF SAYI
 DULI - TRUST COLLEGE; STAND NUMBER 1146 MAPFUNGAUTSI
 DZIVARENGAMWA; MANYEPA VILLAGE CHIEF SAI
 GANYE; BANDA VILLAGE CHIEF NEMANGWE
 NJELELE; STAND NO. 1771 NYARADZA TOWNSHIP GOKWE TOWN
 NYAJE; TANYANYIWA VILLAGE CHIEF NJELELE
 NYAMACHENI; TAKAENDESA VILLAG ECHIEF NJELELE
 NYARADZA; NDLALAMBI CHIEF NEMANGWE
 NYOKA; HIGH DHLANA VILLAGE CHIEF NEMANGWE
 RUFARO; (KASANGO) KANYEMBA VILLAGE CHIEF SAYI
 RUTENDO; MAWARE VILLAGE CHIEF SAI
 SAWI; (GWARISONDE) GWADA VILLAGE CHIEF NEMANGWE
 SAYI; SAI VILLAGE CHIEF SAI
 SELIMA; SIYAKATAZA VILLAGE CHIEF MKOKA
 ST PAULS GOKWE; STAND NUMBER 3313 MAPFUNGAUTSI GOKWE
 SUNGANAI; DOKOTERA VILLAGE, CHIEFE NEMANGWE
 TARE ST BONIFACE; MUDZIMIRI VILLAGE CHIEF NEMANGWE
 THE LOGOS EMPOWERMENT GIRLS COLLEGE; RUHWAYA VILLAGE CHIEF NJELELE
 TICHAKUNDA; MKOKA VILLAGE MKOKA
 TONGWE; MUZA VILLAGE CHIEF NJELELE
 VULINDLELA; MVUNDLA VILLAGE CHIEF NJELELE
 W. BOOMS COLLEGE; 1423 LIGHT INDUSTRY GOKWE TOWN
 ZHAMBA SECONDARY
 GAWA; PUTUNGWANE VILLAGE CHIEF NEMNAGWE
 GOMOGURU; MAGEGE VILLAGE CHIEF NJELELE
 GUKURE MAKOMO VILLAGE CHIEF NEMANGWE
 GULUKA; SECONDARY ZARANYIKA VILLAGE CHIEF MKOKA
 GWAMURE; MABHUKU VILLAGE CHIEF NJELELE
 GWEHAVA; MADZIVANZIRA VILLAGE CHIEF NJELELE
 HOVANO; CHITUNGWA VILLAGE CHIEF NJELELE
 KANASECONDARY; KANA MISSSION
 KASUWE; DICKSON VILLAGE CHIEF NEMANGWE
 KATSUNGA SECONDARY; MUTSANYAMATE VILLAGE CHIEF SAI
 KUSHINGA (RUMHUMHA); RUMHUMA VILLAGE CHIEF NJELELE
 LUKUKWE CHITEPO; MAGON'O VILLAGE CHIEF MKOKA
 MABOKE; HAKUNAVANHU VILLAGE CHIEF JIRI
 MACHAKATA; MAZA VILLAGE CHIEF NJELELE
 MANYONI; ZIMWARA VILLAGE CHIEF SAI
 MAPFUNGAUTSI; SHABANI VILLAGE CHIEF NJELELE
 MARIMASIMBE; NYIKA VILLAGE CHIEFE JIRI
 MARIRANGWE; MARIGANO VILLAGE CHIEF JIRI
 MASUKA; SECONDARY NEMARINGA VILLAGE CHIEF SAI
 MATEME; PASO VILLAGE CHIEF MKOKA
 (RUJEKO) HIGH; MATETA 2 VILLAGE CHIEF SAI
 MAZINYO; MWENE VILLAGE CHIEF MKOKA
 MBUNGU; MASOCHA VILLAGE CHIEF MKOKA GOKWE
 MUCHADEYI DZVUKE BEZUNGU VILLAGE CHIEF MKOKA
 MUCHIRINJI; NHIDZA VILLAGE CHIEF SAYI
 NEMANGWE; MUSARURWA VILLAGE CHIEF NEMANGWE
 NGOMENI; CHIVIMBO

Primary schools 
Primary schools in Gokwe South District are under the jurisdiction of the Ministry of Primary and Secondary Schools. Source 
 RUGORA ; NHAUDZAWANDA VILLAGE CHIEF NEMANGWE
 BATANAI; CHIBABAIRA VILLAGE CHIEF NEMANGWE 
 BLUE GUM; NYAHUNA VILLAGE CHIEF NJELELE 
 BOPOMA; DHIRORI VILLAGE CHIEF SAI 
 BOVA; SIDODIWE VILLAGE CHIEF NJELELE 
 BOYI; MARIMIRASHIRI VILLAGE CHIEF NEMANGWE 
 CHAMATENDERA; KABIRA VILLAGE CHIEF NEMANGWE 
 CHARAMA; MUBAIWA VILLAGE CHIEF SAI 
 CHAVANYATI; ISAYA VILLAGE CHIEF NJELELE 
 CHEGAMA; RUMHUMHA VILLAGE CHIEF NEMANGWE 
 CHEHAMBA; SIAMANONZI VILLAGE CHIEF MKOKA 
 CHEHANGA; MANJENGWA VILLAGE CHIEF JIRI 
 CHEMBA; PISA VILLAGE CHIEF MKOKA 
 CHEMOWA; JARICHARI VILLAGE CHIEF NJELELE 
 CHIBASA; MAGAMA VILLAGE CHIEF NEMAMGWE 
 CHIDAMOYO; BHARIWA VILLAGE CHIEF 
 CHIDOMA; MAWANA VILLAGE CHIEF NJELELE 
 CHIEDZA; MAZHARA VILLAGE CHIEF SAI 
 CHITA CHEZVIPO ZVEMOTO (CZM); RUHWAYA VILLAGE CHIEF NJELELE 
 CHIUMBU; MUZA VILLAGE CHIEF NJELELE 
 CHIURAI; NAISON VILLAGE CHIEF NEMANGWE 
 CHOTO; CHOTO VILLAGE CHIEF JIRI 
 DAVAMBI; NDAVAMBI VILLAGE CHIEF NJELELE 
 DOPOTA; ZCC DEFE DOPOTA HQ CHIEF MUTENDI 
 DZIRE; TAMBATUBISI VILLAGE CHIEF NEMANGWE 
 DZVUKE; DZVUKE VILLAGE CHIEF MKOKA 
 GABABE; FUSI VILLAGE CHIEF NJELELE 
 GADZA; GADAZA VILLAGE CHIEF MKOKA 
 GANYE; FUNDIKWA VILLAGE CHIEF NEMANGWE 
 GANYUNGU; CHAVHUNDUKA VILLAGE CHIEF NJELELE 
 GAWA; UTUNGWANE VILLAGE CHIEF NEMANAGWE 
 GOKWE ST AGNES; CHIPERE VILLAGE CHIEF NJELELE 
 GWANYIKA; MATENGANYIKA VILLAGE CHIEF NJELELE 
 GWARUSONDE; XOCHIWA VILLAGE CHIEF NEMANGWE 
 GWAVI; SIYAGIJIMA VILLAGE CHIEF NEMANGWE 
 GWEHAVA; MARUMISA VILLAGE CHIEF NJELELE 
 GWENUNGU; HONDO VILLAGE CHIEF NJELELE 
 GWENYA; MANJONJO VILLAGE CHIEF NJELELE 
 GWETSANGA; RINGISAI VILLAGE CHIEF JIRI 
HUCHU; DOKOTERA VILLAGE CHIEF NEMANGWE 
INSUKAMINI; MOSES VILLAGE CHIEF NJELELE 
JAHANA; GUNDWANE VILLAGE CHIEF NJELELE 
JIRI; MADZIKANDA VILLAGE CHIEF JIRI 
JOBORINGO 
JORORO; CHALIBAMBA VILLAGE CHIEF NEMANGWE 
KADZIRAMWANDA; MAWARE VILLAGE CHIEF SAI 
KAGUTA; CHIKWAMBA VILLAGE CHIEF NEMANGWE 
KAMBE; SIBABI VILLAGE CHIEF MKOKA 
KANETOWA; MAJAVE VILLAGE CHIEF SAI 
KANGURA; JOHN VILLAGE CHIEFSAI 
KAPFUNDE; CHARIRA VILLAGE CHIEF NEMANGWE 
KAROVA; TADZIMIGWA VILLAGE CHIEF SAI 
KARUWARE; KARIKOGA VILLAGE CHIEF SAI 
KASANGO; KANYEMBA VILLAGE CHIEF SAYI 
KASIKANA; ZEBEDIA VILLAGE CHIEFE NJELELE 
KASUWE; GUMIREMHETE VILLAGE CHIEF NEMANGWE 
KRIMA; PENSELA VILLAGE CHIEF NJELELE 
KUBENENGURIRA; DANGAREMBIZI VILLAGE CHIEF SAI 
KWARAMBA; KWARAMBA KURUWA VILLAGE CHIEF NEMANGWE 
LUKUKWE; NAISON VILLAGE CHIEF MKOKA 
LUTOTSHWANA; BHENYU VILLAGE HEADMAN MSALA 
MABOKE; MABOKE VILLAGE 
MACHAKATA; MAZA VILLAGE CHIEF NJELELE 
MAGEDE; MAGEDE VILLAGE CHIEF MKOKA 
MALIYAMI; SHABANI VILLAGE CHIEF NJELELE 
MAMHANGWA; MUSHAWIDI VILLAGE CHIEF NEMANGWE 
MANGISI; MUCHENI VILLAGE CHIEF SAI 
MANYENA; MESO VILLAGE CHIEF SAI 
MANYEPA; MANYEPA VILLAGE CHIEF SAI 
MANYEWU; GUMIREMHETE VILLAGE CHIEF SAI 
MANYONI; KURURA VILLAGE CHIEF SAI 
MAPFUMO; MAPFUMO VILLAGE CHIEF NJELELE 
MAPFUNGAUTSI PRIMARY; STAND NUMBER 2322 MAPFUNGAUTSI GOKWE 
MAPIWA; MAKIWA VILLAGE CHIEF NJELELE 
MAPU; KAITANO VILLAGE CHIEF NJELELE 
MARIRANGWE; CHIREVEREVE VILLAGE CHIEF JIRI 
MASAWI; MANQUMA VILLAGE CHIEF NJELELE 
MASEKESA; ZVAWANDA VILLAGE CHIEF JIRI 
MASUKA; NDAEDZWA VILLAGE CHIEF SAI 
MASUKA; MANDIPOTA VILLAGE CHIEF SAI 
MATEME SDA; MAGUMURA VILLAGE CHIEF MKOKA 
MATETA 1; MATETA VILLAGE CHIEF NEMANGWE 
MATETA 2; MATETA VILLAGE CHIEF SAI 
MATURA; MATURA VILLAGE CHIEF JIRI 
MAWISA; NDOSA VILLAGE CHIEF SAI 
MAZINYO ST HUGHS; MWENE VILLAGE CHIEF MKOKA 
MBUNGU; MASOCHA VILLAGE CHIEF MKOKA GOKWE 
MKOKA; MKOKA VILLAGE CHIEF MKOKA 
MLALAZI; MLALAZI VILLAGE CHIEF NEMANGWE 
MSALA; SIAMEJA VILLAGE HEADMAN MSALA 
MTANKI SDA; MTAGWI VILLAGE CHIEF NJELELE 
MUCHIRINJI; NHIDZA VILLAGE 
MUDZIMUNDIRINGE; KATEMA VILLAGE CHIEF JIRI 
MUDZONGWE; FAKAZI VILLAGE CHIEF NJELELE 
MURANDU; MURANDU VILLAGE CHIEF NJELELE 
MURWIRA; MANHEMBE VILLAGE, CHIEF JIRI 
MUSITA; MATEEESANWA VILLAGE CHIEF NEMANGWE 
MUTANGE; CHADAKUFA VILLAGE CHIEF NJELELE 
MUTENDI; MUDZVOVA VILLAGE CHIEF MUTENDI GOKWE SOUTH 
MUYAMBI; MUYAMBI CHIEF MKOKA 
MWAMBANI; KHUMBUSI VILLAGE CHIEF MKOKA 
MWEMBESI; SOTILE VILLAGE CHIEF NJLELELE 
NDARIRE; MUTSVANGI VILLAGE CHIEF MKOKA 
NDHLALAMBI; SEVEN VILLAGE CHIEF NEMANGWE 
NGANI; MKONDO VILLAGE CHIEF NEMANGWE 
NGOMENI; CHIVIMBO VILLAGE, CHIEF SAI GOKWE 
NGONDOMA; MINARA VILLAGE CHIEF NJELELE 
NHONGO; MBEKA VILLAGE CHIEF NJELELE 
NYAGOMBE; MAWARE VILLAGE CHIEF NEMANGWE 
NYAHUNI; MAKAI VILLAGE CHIEF SAI 
NYAJE; DUMEZWENI VILLAGE CHIEF MKOKA 
NYAMACHENI; TAKAENDESA VILLAGE CHIEF NJELELE 
NYAMHUNGA; MPINDI VILLAGE CHIEF SAI 
NYARADZA; MABIWA VILLAGE CHIEF NEMANGWE 
NYARUPAKWE; JEFREY VILLAGE CHIEF NJELELE 
PARADZA; PARADZA VILLAGE, CHIEF JIRI, GOKWE 
RONGA RONGA; SIYAMWANJA VILLAGE CHIEF SAI 
RUGORA; NYUWANI VILLAGE CHIEF NEMANGWE 
SACRED HEART; SIANUNGU VILLAGE CHIEF MKOKA 
SASAME; GANDIWA VILLAGE CHIEF NEMANGWE 
SATENGWE; NAISON VILLAGE CHIEF NJELELE 
SAVARANDA; SIYAMUYALA VILLAGE CHIEF NEMANGWE 
SAWI; GWADA VILLAGE CHIEF NEMANGWE 
SAYI; SAYI VILLAGE CHIEF SAI 
SELIMA; BHAGU 
SENGWA; CHITUNGWA VILLAGE CHIEF NJELELE 
SIMBE; JUCHU VILLAGE CHIEF NJELELE 
SIZANANI; CHAMBANI VILLAGE CHIEF NEMANGWE 
ST AGNES CRECHE AND PRE-SCHOOL; RUHWAYA VILLAGE CHIEF NJELELE 
ST BONIFACE TARE; ZAREVA VILLAGE CHIEF NEMANGWE 
ST CUTHBETHS MSORO; CHAPINDUKA VILLAGE CHIEF NJELELE 
ST PAUL; STAND NUMBER 3313 MAPFUNGAUTSI GOKWE 
SUNGWIZA; MASHOVE VILLAGE CHIEF NEMANGWE 
SVISVI; MANDABA VILLAGE CHIEF NEMANGWE 
TACHI; TACHI BUSINESS CENTRE CHIEF MKOKA 
ZAMBEZI; MPARAGWA VILLAGE CHIEF NEMANGWE 
ZAROVA; MAMVURA VILLAGE CHIEF NEMANGWE 
ZENGEYA; PEDZERAI VILLAGE CHIEF JIRI 
ZHAMBA; CHIDHEREMA VILLAGE CHIEF SAI 
ZHOMBE SDA; MARIMIROFA VILLAGE CHIEF NJELELE 
ZIMBODZA; TAGARA

See also
 Gokwe North District
 Gokwe centre
 Mutange Dam

References

 Nyambara, Pius Shungudzapera (2001) "The Politics of Land Acquisition and Struggles over Land in the 'Communal' Areas of Zimbabwe: The Gokwe Region in the 1980s and 1990s" Africa: Journal of the International African Institute 71(2): pp. 253–285

 
Districts of Midlands Province